Banchero is a surname. Notable people with the surname include:

Angelo Banchero (1744–1793), Italian painter
Chris Banchero (born 1989), American-born Filipino-Italian basketball player
Elvio Banchero (1904–1982), Italian football player
Paolo Banchero (born 2002), Italian-American basketball player